Lion Feuchtwanger (7 July 1884 – 21 December 1958) was a German Jewish novelist and playwright.  A prominent figure in the literary world of Weimar Germany, he influenced contemporaries including playwright Bertolt Brecht.

Feuchtwanger's Judaism and fierce criticism of the National Socialist German Workers (Nazi) Party, years before it assumed power, ensured that he would be a target of government-sponsored persecution after Adolf Hitler's appointment as chancellor of Germany in January 1933.  Following a brief period of internment in France and a harrowing escape from Continental Europe, he found asylum in the United States, where he died in 1958.

Life and career

Ancestry 
Feuchtwanger's Jewish ancestors originated from the Middle Franconian city of Feuchtwangen; following a pogrom in 1555, it had expelled all its resident Jews. Some of the expellees subsequently settled in Fürth, where they were called the Feuchtwangers, meaning those from Feuchtwangen. Feuchtwanger's grandfather Elkan moved to Munich in the middle of the 19th century.

Early life 
He was born in 1884 to Orthodox Jewish margarine manufacturer Sigmund Feuchtwanger and his wife, Johanna née Bodenheimer. He was the oldest in a family of nine siblings of whom two, Martin and Ludwig Feuchtwanger, became authors; Ludwig's son is the London-based historian Edgar Feuchtwanger. Two of his sisters settled in Palestine following the rise of the Nazi Party. One was killed in a concentration camp, and another settled in New York.

Feuchtwanger studied literature and philosophy in the universities of Munich and Berlin. He made his first attempt at writing while still a student and won an award. In 1903 in Munich, he passed his Abitur examinations at an elite school, Wilhelmsgymnasium. He then studied history, philosophy and German philology in Munich and Berlin. He received his PhD in 1907, under Francis Muncker, on Heinrich Heine's The Rabbi of Bacharach.

Early career 

After studying a variety of subjects, he became a theatre critic and founded the culture magazine Der Spiegel in 1908. The first issue appeared on 30 April. After 15 issues and six months, Der Spiegel merged with Siegfried Jacobsohn's journal Die Schaubühne (renamed in 1918 to Die Weltbühne) for which Feuchtwanger continued to write.  In 1912, he married a Jewish merchant's daughter, Marta Loeffler. She was pregnant at the wedding, but the child died shortly after birth.

At the outbreak of the First World War in 1914, Feuchtwanger served in the German military service but was released early for health reasons.  His experience as a soldier contributed to his leftist writings.

In 1916, he published a play based on the story of Joseph Süß Oppenheimer which premiered in 1917, but Feuchtwanger withdrew it a couple years later as he was dissatisfied with it.

During the German Revolution of 1918–1919, Feuchtwanger was ill and unable to participate.

Association with Brecht 
Feuchtwanger soon became a figure in the literary world, and he was sought out by the young Bertolt Brecht. Both  collaborated on drafts of Brecht's early work, The Life of Edward II of England, in 1923–1924. According to Feuchtwanger's widow, Marta, Feuchtwanger was a possible source for the titles of two other Brecht works, including Drums in the Night (first called Spartakus by Brecht).

Shift from drama to novels 
After some success as a playwright, Feuchtwanger shifted his emphasis to the historical novel. His most successful work in this genre was Jud Süß (Jew Sweet), written 1921–1922, published 1925, which was well received internationally.  His second great success was The Ugly Duchess Margarete Maultasch. For professional reasons, he moved to Berlin in 1925 and then to a large villa in Grunewald in 1932.

He published the first part of the trilogy Josephus The Jewish War in 1932.

Persecution by the Nazis

Early opposition 
Feuchtwanger was one of the first to produce propaganda against Hitler and the Nazi Party. As early as 1920 he published in the satirical text Conversations with the Wandering Jew:

Towers of Hebrew books were burned, and bonfires were erected high up in the clouds, and people burnt, innumerable priests and voices sang: Gloria in excelsis Deo. Traits of men, women, children dragged themselves across the square from all sides, they were naked or in rags, and they had nothing with them as corpses and the tatters of book rolls of torn, disgraced, soiled with feces Books roles. And they followed men and women in kaftans and dresses the children in our day, countless, endless.

Rise of Nazism and exile 
In 1930, Feuchtwanger published , a fictionalized account of the rise and fall of the Nazi Party (in 1930, he considered it a thing of the past) during the inflation era. The new regime soon began persecuting him, and while he was on a speaking tour of America, in Washington, D.C., he was guest of honor at a dinner hosted by the then ambassador Friedrich Wilhelm von Prittwitz und Gaffron on the same day (30 January 1933) that Hitler was appointed Chancellor. The next day, Prittwitz resigned from the diplomatic corps and called Feuchtwanger to recommend that he not return home.

In 1933, while Feuchtwanger was on tour, his house was ransacked by government agents who stole or destroyed many items from his extensive library, including invaluable manuscripts of some of his projected works (one of the characters in The Oppermanns undergoes an identical experience). In the summer of 1933, his name appeared on the first of Hitler's Germany Ausbürgerungsliste, which were documents by which the Nazis arbitrarily deprived Germans of their citizenship and so rendered them stateless. During that time, he published the novel The Oppermanns. Feuchtwanger and his wife did not return to Germany but moved to Southern France, settling in Sanary-sur-Mer. His works were included among those burned in the 10 May 1933, Nazi book burnings held across Germany. Later Success and The Oppermanns would become the first two parts of the Wartesaal ("The Waiting Room") trilogy. 

On 25 August 1933, the official government gazette, Reichsanzeiger, included Feuchtwanger's name on the list of those whose German citizenship was revoked because of "disloyalty to the German Reich and the German people." Because Feuchtwanger had addressed and predicted many of the Nazis' crimes even before they came to power, Hitler considered him a personal enemy and the Nazis designated Feuchtwanger as the "Enemy of the state number one," as mentioned in The Devil in France.

In his writings, Feuchtwanger exposed Nazi racist policies years before the British and French governments abandoned their policy of appeasement towards Hitler. He remembered that American politicians were also among those who suggested that "Hitler be given a chance." With the publication of Success in 1930 and The Oppermanns in 1933, he became a prominent spokesman in opposition to the Third Reich. Within a year, the novel was translated into Czech, Danish, English, Finnish, Hebrew, Hungarian, Norwegian, Polish and Swedish languages. In 1936, still in Sanary, he wrote The Pretender (Der falsche Nero), in which he compared the Roman upstart Terentius Maximus, who had claimed to be Nero, with Hitler.

After leaving Germany in 1933, Feuchtwanger lived in Sanary-sur-Mer. The high sales of his books, especially in the Anglo-Saxon world, allowed him a relatively comfortable life in exile. In 1940, he finished Wartesaal with the third novel, Exil (translated into English as Paris Gazette)

Imprisonment and escape 
When France declared war on Germany in 1939, Feuchtwanger was interned for a few weeks in Camp des Milles. When the Germans invaded France in 1940, Feuchtwanger was captured and again imprisoned at Les Milles. Later, the prisoners of Les Milles were moved to a makeshift tent camp near Nîmes because of the advance of German troops. From there, he was smuggled to Marseille disguised as a woman. After months of waiting in Marseille, he was able to flee with his wife Marta to the United States via Spain and Portugal, staying briefly in Estoril. He escaped with the help of Marta; Varian Fry, an American journalist who helped refugees escape from occupied France; Hiram Bingham IV, US Vice Consul in Marseille; Myles Standish, US Vice Consul in Marseille; Waitstill Sharp and Martha Sharp, a Unitarian minister and his wife who were in Europe on a similar mission as Fry. Waitstill Sharp volunteered to accompany Feuchtwanger by rail from Marseille, across Spain, to Lisbon. Had Feuchtwanger been recognized at border crossings in France or Spain, he would have been detained and turned over to the Gestapo.

Realizing that Feuchtwanger might be abducted by Nazi agents even in Portugal, Martha Sharp gave up her own berth on the Excalibur so Feuchtwanger could sail immediately for New York City with her husband.

Asylum in United States 
Feuchtwanger was granted political asylum in the United States and settled in Los Angeles in 1941, when he published a memoir of his internment, The Devil in France (Der Teufel in Frankreich).

In 1943, Feuchtwanger bought Villa Aurora in Pacific Palisades, California, and he continued to write there until his death in 1958.

In 1944, he cofounded the publishing house Aurora-Verlag in New York City.

Stalinism 
In response to the Western Powers pursuing a policy of appeasement of Nazi Germany and Fascist Italy (the Anglo-German Naval Treaty; allowing the reoccupation of the Rhineland; non-intervention against the Falangist Coup in Spain; Italy's attack on Abyssinia), he flirted with Soviet communism out of a longing to find the staunchest enemy of Germany's National Socialism 

From November 1936 to February 1937 he travelled to the Soviet Union. In his book, Moskau 1937, he praised life under Joseph Stalin. Feuchtwanger also defended the Great Purge and the show trials which were then taking place against both real and imagined 'Trotskyites' and 'enemies of the people'. Feuchtwanger's praise of Stalin triggered outrage from Arnold Zweig and Franz Werfel. The book has been criticized by Trotskyists as a work of naive apologism. Feuchtwanger's friendly attitude toward Stalin later delayed his naturalization in the United States.

Postwar 
During the McCarthy era, he became the target of suspicion as a pro-Soviet intellectual. In 1947 he wrote a play about the Salem Witch Trials, Wahn oder der Teufel in Boston (Delusion, or The Devil in Boston), thus anticipating the theme of The Crucible by Arthur Miller; Wahn premiered in Germany in 1949. It was translated by June Barrows Mussey and performed in Los Angeles in 1953 under the title "The Devil in Boston." In New York a Yiddish translation was shown. At the end of life, he dealt with Jewish themes again (The Jewess of Toledo) and advocated for the State of Israel as a Jewish refuge.

In 1953, Feuchtwanger won the National Prize of East Germany first Class for art and literature.

Illness and death 
Lion Feuchtwanger became ill with stomach cancer in 1957. After several operations he died from internal bleeding in late 1958. His wife Marta continued to live in their house on the coast and remained an important figure in the exile community, devoting the remainder of her life to the work of her husband.  Before her death in 1987, Marta Feuchtwanger donated her husband's papers, photos and personal library to the Feuchtwanger Memorial Library, housed within the Special Collections of the Doheny Memorial Library at the University of Southern California.

Major works

Jud Süß 

Feuchtwanger was already well known throughout Germany in 1925, when his first popular novel, Jud Süß (Jew Suss), appeared. The story of Joseph Süß Oppenheimer had been the subject of a number of literary and dramatic treatments over the course of the past century, the earliest Wilhelm Hauff's 1827 novella. The most successful literary adaptation was Feuchtwanger's 1925 novel, based on a play he had written in 1916 but then withdrawn. Feuchtwanger intended his portrayal of Süß not as an antisemitic slur but as a study of the tragedy caused by the human weaknesses of greed, pride, and ambition.

The novel was rejected by the major publishing houses and then was reluctantly taken on by a small publishing house. However, the novel was so well received that it went through five printings of 39,000 copies within a year as well as being translated into 17 languages by 1931. The novel's success established Feuchtwanger as a major German author as well as giving him a royalty stream that afforded him a measure of financial independence for the rest of his life.

His drama and his hugely successful novel were adapted for the cinema screen initially in a sympathetic version produced at Denham Studios in Great Britain in 1934 under the direction of fellow German expatriate Lothar Mendes with one of Germany's greatest actors, also a refugee from Nazi persecution, Conrad Veidt: Jew Süss.
The NSDAP party in Germany then made their own anti-Semitic version under the very same title, to undercut the British film. The Nazi film industry version was made under the direction of Veit Harlan: Jud Süß (1940). Unlike the British version, the anti-Semitic film, released in 1940, portrays Oppenheimer as an evil character.

The Oppermanns 

In January 1933, Hitler becomes the Chancellor of Germany. Feuchtwanger reacted to the regime change with the novel The Oppermanns. At first, Feuchtwanger was writing it as a screenplay proposed by the British Government, however, it was never completed and instead was reworked into a novel, resulting in the book's style, which differs with quick-cuts and literary montage sequences. After being released the same year, it instantly became popular and was translated into over 10 languages. Klaus Mann  later praised the novel as the "most striking, most widely read narrative description of the calamity that descended over Germany"; Frederick S. Roffman wrote in The New York Times in 1983 that "no single historical or fictional work has more tellingly or insightfully depicted the relentless disintegration of German humanism, the insidious manner in which Nazism began to permeate the fabric of German society." In 2018, Deutsche Welle put the novel in their "100 German Must-Reads" list, called it "Feutchwanger's most recognized novel" and wrote that today it is "considered one of the most important literary works documenting the downfall of a democracy".

As Roffman noted, Feuchtwanger's popularity has declined after 1950s in the English-speaking countries, while remaining strong in the German-speaking ones. In 2022, the novel was rediscovered, and a new version of the English translation of The Oppermanns was released, with an introduction by Joshua Cohen, who also noted the lack of Feuchtwanger's popularity in English-speaking counntries:  In his review of the novel, Cohen calls it "one of the last masterpieces of German Jewish culture".

Books

Die häßliche Herzogin Margarete Maultasch (The Ugly Duchess), 1923 —about Margarete Maultasch (14th century in Tyrol)
Leben Eduards des Zweiten von England (The Life of Edward II of England), 1924: written with Bertolt Brecht.
Jud Süß (Jew Suess, Power), 1925.
PEP: J.L. Wetcheeks amerikanisches Liederbuch (PEP: J.L. Wetcheek's American Song Book), 1928
The Wartesaal Trilogy (or, The "Waiting Room" Trilogy)
Erfolg. Drei Jahre Geschichte einer Provinz (Success: Three Years in the Life of a Province), 1930
[[The Oppermanns|Die Geschwister Oppermann (The Oppermanns)]], Querido, 1933; published in an English translation by James Cleugh, by Secker, 1933
Exil (Paris Gazette); German-language edition published by Querido, in Amsterdam, 1940; published in an English translation by Willa and Edwin Muir, by Viking, 1940
The Josephus Trilogy—about Flavius Josephus beginning in the year 60 in Rome
Der jüdische Krieg (Josephus), 1932
Die Söhne (The Jew of Rome), 1935
Der Tag wird kommen (Das gelobte Land, The day will come, Josephus and the Emperor), 1942
Marianne in Indien und sieben andere Erzählungen (Marianne in Indien, Höhenflugrekord, Stierkampf, Polfahrt, Nachsaison, Herrn Hannsickes Wiedergeburt, Panzerkreuzer Orlow, Geschichte des Gehirnphysiologen Dr. Bl.), 1934—title translated into English as Little Tales and as Marianne in India and seven other tales (Marianne in India, Altitude Record, Bullfight, Polar Expedition, The Little Season, Herr Hannsicke's Second Birth, The Armored Cruiser "Orlov", History of the Brain Specialist Dr. Bl.)
Der falsche Nero (The Pretender), 1936—about Terentius Maximus, the "False Nero"
Moskau 1937 (Moscow 1937), 1937
Unholdes Frankreich (Ungracious France; also Der Teufel in Frankreich, The Devil in France), 1941
Die Brüder Lautensack (Die Zauberer, Double, Double, Toil and Trouble, The Lautensack Brothers), 1943
Simone, 1944
Der treue Peter (Faithful Peter), 1946
Die Füchse im Weinberg (Proud Destiny, Waffen für Amerika, Foxes in the Vineyard), 1947/48 - a novel mainly about Pierre Beaumarchais and Benjamin Franklin beginning in 1776's Paris
Wahn oder Der Teufel in Boston. Ein Stück in drei Akten ("The Devil in Boston: A Play about the Salem Witchcraft Trials"), Los Angeles 1948.
Odysseus and the Swine, and Other Stories, 1949; a collection of sixteen short stories, some published in book form for the first time (London: Hutchinson International Authors Ltd, 1949)
Goya, 1951—a novel about the famous painter Francisco Goya in the 1790s in Spain ("This is the Hour" New York: Heritage Press, 1956)
Narrenweisheit oder Tod und Verklärung des Jean-Jacques Rousseau ('Tis folly to be wise, or, Death and transfiguration of Jean-Jaques Rousseau), 1952, a novel set before and during the Great French Revolution
Die Jüdin von Toledo (Spanische Ballade, Raquel, The Jewess of Toledo), 1955
Jefta und seine Tochter (Jephthah and his Daughter, Jephta and his daughter), 1957

Awards 

 1957: National Jewish Book Award for Raquel: The Jewess of Toledo

See also
 Exilliteratur

Notes

Further reading
 
 
 
 
 
 Feuchtwanger Studies - edited collection series from Peter Lang publishing - https://www.peterlang.com/series/fst

External links
 
Feuchtwanger Memorial Library
International Feuchtwanger Society (incl. Newsletter)
Interview of Marta Feuchtwanger, wife of Lion, Center for Oral History Research, UCLA Library Special Collections, University of California, Los Angeles.
Villa Aurora
 
 Memorial article in Ha'artez, July 7,2014 
(Web portal www.lionfeuchtwanger.de)
 Feuchtwanger Research
Feuchtwanger Studies - book series 

1884 births
1958 deaths
People educated at the Wilhelmsgymnasium (Munich)
People from Munich
People from the Kingdom of Bavaria
Jewish emigrants from Nazi Germany to the United States
German historical novelists
Writers from Bavaria
Jewish German writers
Writers about the Soviet Union
Exilliteratur writers
Burials at Woodlawn Memorial Cemetery, Santa Monica
German male novelists
German male dramatists and playwrights
20th-century German novelists
20th-century German dramatists and playwrights
20th-century German male writers